Dick's Primal Burger is a restaurant with two locations in Portland, Oregon.

Description 

Dick's Primal Burger is a restaurant with locations on Woodstock Boulevard in southeast Portland's Woodstock neighborhood and on North Williams Avenue in the northeast Portland part of the Boise neighborhood. Considered a "sister-restaurant" to Dick's Kitchen with counter service for lunch and dinner, the menu has included burgers, bowls, soups, salads, and sides such as French fries. The Salmon Nation is a salmon burger and the Woodstock is a veggie burger. The BYO Burger allows patrons to select preferred choices of meat (venison and boar), cheese (blue, cheddar, goat, Swiss), and toppings (grilled onions, kimchi, or pineapple). The Cobb bowl has turkey, bacon, avocado, blue cheese, and tomato. The chili has beef, organic red beans, cumin, and smoked paprika.

For Burger Week in 2022, the restaurant's Dick's on Fire included beef, Tillamook Pepper Jack cheese, Ghost Scream ghost pepper jam, serrano peppers, roasted garlic aioli, and gluten-free crispy onions. The restaurant also serves alcoholic milkshakes, including the Oregon Special with hazelnut liqueur and an Irish coffee with salted caramel.

History 
Owner Richard Satnick opened Dick's Primal Burger in Woodstock in November 2015.

Previously, a Dick's Primal Burger operated on Cully Boulevard in northeast Portland.

Reception 
Chad Walsh included Dick's Primal Burger in Eater Portland's 2016 list of "Top Quality Fast Food Spots in Portland". The website's Maya MacEvoy included the chili in a 2021 list of "Where to Find Bowls of Captivating Chili in Portland and Beyond" and a 2022 list of "Where to Find Wildly Tasty Game Burgers in Portland".

See also
 List of hamburger restaurants

References

External links

 
 

Boise, Portland, Oregon
Hamburger restaurants in the United States
Northeast Portland, Oregon
Restaurants in Portland, Oregon
Woodstock, Portland, Oregon